Ussara hilarodes is a species of sedge moth in the genus Ussara. It was described by Edward Meyrick in 1909. It is found in Assam, India.

References

Moths described in 1909
Glyphipterigidae